Rydell Joseph Melancon, (sometimes spelled Malancon), (born January 10, 1962) is a former linebacker in the National Football League. Melancon was drafted in the fourth round of the 1984 NFL Draft by the Atlanta Falcons and played that season with the team. After two seasons away from the NFL, Melancon played with the Green Bay Packers during the 1987 NFL season. He played at the collegiate level at Louisiana State University. Melancon was born in New Orleans, Louisiana.

References

Atlanta Falcons players
Green Bay Packers players
American football linebackers
LSU Tigers football players
Players of American football from New Orleans
1962 births
Living people